Lee Cremo (30 December 1938 – 10 October 1999) was a Mi'kmaq fiddler from Cape Breton Island, Canada.

Early life
He was born on 30 December 1938 in Barra Head, Richmond County, Cape Breton Island. His family moved to Eskasoni, Cape Breton when he was four. Cremo had a lengthy career as a fiddler performing and recording around Canada.

Career
He primarily worked through the Cape Breton style of fiddle playing, performing many traditional pieces, but he also composed his own works including: 'Shubenacadie Reserve Reel,' 'Cactus Polka,' 'Irish Fiddler,' and 'Constitution Breakdown.' His music was recording as part of several Smithsonian Folkways recordings, including: Indigenous North American music, Creation's Journey (Smithsonian/Folkways SF 40410, 1994) and Wood That Sings: Indian Fiddle Music of the Americas (Smithsonian/Folkways 40472 1998). Cremo was also an active representative of the Cape Breton Mi'kmaq community. The Porcupine Awards for folk music offer the Lee Cremo Award for Native Artists. His tunes have been recorded by numerous contemporary fiddlers, including Sierra Noble and Ashley MacIsaac. Cremo died on 10 October 1999.

Awards 
Cremo won numerous awards during his career. He won the Maritime Old Time Fiddling Championship six times, "Best Bow Arm in the World" at the World Fiddling Championships in Nashville, Tennessee, and "Canadian Champion" at the Alberta Tar Sands Competition. In 1996 he won an East Coast Music Award for best First Nations recording.

References

1938 births
1999 deaths
20th-century First Nations people
20th-century Canadian violinists and fiddlers
Cape Breton fiddlers
First Nations musicians
Mi'kmaq people
20th-century Canadian male musicians
Musicians from Nova Scotia
Canadian male violinists and fiddlers